Jack Ziebell (born 28 February 1991) is a professional Australian rules footballer playing for the North Melbourne Football Club in the Australian Football League (AFL). Ziebell received a nomination for the 2009 AFL Rising Star award in round 7 of the 2009 season. Widely regarded as a fearless footballer, known for putting his body on the line, he served as North Melbourne captain for six years from 2017 to 2022.

Early career
Ziebell played for the Murray Bushrangers alongside fellow draftee Steele Sidebottom, and was an important part of the Bushrangers premiership win in 2008, averaging 18 possessions, two goals and six marks a match. Ziebell represented Vic Country at the 2008 NAB AFL Under 18 Championships and gained All-Australian Honours after averaging 17 disposals per match.

Ziebell is originally from Wodonga, Victoria, and attended Caulfield Grammar School as a boarding student where he dominated school football.

AFL career

Ziebell made his debut in 2009, his first season at the club, and had an instant impact. He produced consistently impressive performances over the first two months and was rewarded with the Round 7 NAB Rising Star nomination for his 23 disposal and 1 goal game against Port Adelaide. North Melbourne coach, Danielle Laidley, singled him out in the post-match press conference and declared him a "leader" and a "superstar [in the making]". Ziebell was regarded as one of the favourites for the 2009 NAB Rising Star award at the time which is awarded to the best rookie at the end of the season.

However, Ziebell suffered from minor injuries for the next few weeks and his contributions were restricted. His season took an unfortunate turn when he broke his leg against the Adelaide Crows in round 12. He missed the remainder of the 2009 season, after playing just 10 games. However, due to the injury restricting him from playing, Ziebell has retained eligibility for the Rising Star award in 2010, again making him one of the early favourites.

Late in the 2011 season, Ziebell was suspended for three matches for rough conduct on  captain Nick Riewoldt. This hit was however featured on the AFL's official advertising campaign for the 2012 AFL season.

In December 2016, Ziebell was named North Melbourne's new captain, replacing Andrew Swallow.

Statistics
Updated to the end of the round 1, 2023.

|-
| 2009 ||  || 19
| 10 || 2 || 2 || 108 || 47 || 155 || 42 || 28 || 0.2 || 0.2 || 10.8 || 4.7 || 15.5 || 4.2 || 2.8 || 0
|-
| 2010 ||  || 7
| 14 || 2 || 6 || 126 || 90 || 216 || 46 || 60 || 0.1 || 0.4 || 9.0 || 6.4 || 15.4 || 3.3 || 5.0 || 1
|-
| 2011 ||  || 7
| 21 || 6 || 4 || 255 || 137 || 392 || 63 || 104 || 0.3 || 0.2 || 12.1 || 6.5 || 18.7 || 3.0 || 5.0 || 4
|-
| 2012 ||  || 7
| 17 || 9 || 2 || 222 || 113 || 335 || 67 || 65 || 0.5 || 0.1 || 13.1 || 5.6 || 18.7 || 3.9 || 3.8 || 3
|-
| 2013 ||  || 7
| 18 || 20 || 8 || 259 || 120 || 379 || 67 || 97 || 1.1 || 0.4 || 14.4 || 6.7 || 21.1 || 3.7 || 5.4 || 6
|-
| 2014 ||  || 7
| 20 || 18 || 15 || 240 || 116 || 356 || 85 || 94 || 0.9 || 0.8 || 12.0 || 5.8 || 17.8 || 4.3 || 4.7 || 3
|-
| 2015 ||  || 7
| 24 || 15 || 16 || 354 || 112 || 466 || 93 || 134 || 0.6 || 0.7 || 14.8 || 4.7 || 19.4 || 3.9 || 5.6 || 8
|-
| 2016 ||  || 7
| 23 || 18 || 13 || 352 || 163 || 515 || 84 || 112 || 0.8 || 0.6 || 15.3 || 7.1 || 22.4 || 3.7 || 4.9 || 7
|-
| 2017 ||  || 7
| 19 || 13 || 6 || 262 || 160 || 422 || 66 || 110 || 0.7 || 0.3 || 13.8 || 8.4 || 22.2 || 3.5 || 5.8 || 1
|-
| 2018 ||  || 7
| 22 || 35 || 29 || 267 || 109 || 376 || 104 || 77 || 1.6 || 1.3 || 12.1 || 5.0 || 17.1 || 4.7 || 3.5 || 7
|-
| 2019 ||  || 7
| 22 || 24 || 16 || 282 || 168 || 450 || 84 || 105 || 1.1 || 0.7 || 12.8 || 7.6 || 20.5 || 3.8 || 4.8 || 10
|-
| 2020 ||  || 7
| 8 || 1 || 7 || 38 || 25 || 63 || 25 || 16 || 0.1 || 0.9 || 4.8 || 3.1 || 7.9 || 3.1 || 2.0 || 0
|-
| 2021 ||  || 7
| 21 || 2 || 0 || 426 || 104 || 530 || 155 || 40 || 0.1 || 0.0 || 20.3 || 5.0 || 25.2 || 7.4 || 1.9 || 2
|-
| 2022 ||  || 7
| 19 || 17 || 8 || 171 || 85 || 256 || 74 || 42 || 0.9 || 0.4 || 9.0 || 4.5 || 13.5 || 3.9 || 2.2 || 4
|-
| 2023 ||  || 7
| 1 || 0 || 0 || 22 || 4 || 26 || 9 || 2 || 0.0 || 0.0 || 22.0 || 4.0 || 26.0 || 9.0 || 2.0 || 
|- class=sortbottom
! colspan=3 | Career
! 259 !! 182 !! 132 !! 3384 !! 1552 !! 4936 !! 1064 !! 1085 !! 0.7 !! 0.5 !! 13.1 !! 6.0 !! 19.1 !! 4.1 !! 4.2 !! 56
|}

Notes

Honours and achievements
 North Melbourne captain: 2017–2022
 22under22 team: 2013
 AFL Rising Star nominee: 2009

References

External links

1991 births
Living people
North Melbourne Football Club players
People educated at Caulfield Grammar School
Australian rules footballers from Victoria (Australia)
Murray Bushrangers players
People from Wodonga
AFL Academy graduates